The Warren Street Bypass is a limited-access bypass in the Reading area in Berks County, in the eastern part of the U.S. state of Pennsylvania. It consists of segments of:
U.S. Route 222/U.S. Route 422 from West Lawn to Wyomissing
Pennsylvania Route 12 from Wyomissing to Hyde Park

References 
Limited-access roads in Pennsylvania
Transportation in Berks County, Pennsylvania
Transportation in Reading, Pennsylvania
Bypasses in the United States